John Skelton may refer to:

John Skelton (poet) (c.1460–1529), English poet.
John de Skelton, MP for Cumberland (UK Parliament constituency)
John Skelton (died 1439), MP for Cumberland (UK Parliament constituency)
John Skelton (American football) (born 1988), American football quarterback
John Skelton (sculptor) (1923–1999), letterer and sculptor
John Skelton (artist) (1925–2009), Irish artist
John Skelton (author) (1831–1897) Scottish lawyer, historian, biographer, literary correspondent and writer on social problems

See also 
John Shelton (disambiguation)